The 2011 Veikkausliiga was the 81st season of top-tier football in Finland. It began on 2 May 2011 and ended on 29 October 2011. HJK were the defending champions and successfully defended their title.

The pre-season was severely affected by license revocations to two teams, which eventually resulted in a later than originally scheduled begin date and an increase of scheduled matches from 26 to 33 per team.

Teams
The league was originally supposed to have 14 teams, but AC Oulu was refused a license due to club's bad economic situation and Tampere United was excluded from every official competition of Football Association of Finland due to breaking the rules of the association, and the league will therefore be played with only 12 teams. AC Oulu was, however, obtained a license for Ykkönen, where it will play this season.

FC Lahti were relegated to Ykkönen after finishing at the bottom of the 2010 season. Their place was taken by Ykkönen champions RoPS. 13th-placed Veikkausliiga team JJK and Ykkönen runners-up FC Viikingit competed in a two-legged relegation play-offs for one spot in this season. JJK won 3–1 on aggregate and thereby retained their league position once again.

Team summaries

Managerial changes

League table

Results
As a consequence of the decreased number of teams immediately prior to the start of the season, the schedule for this season had to be significantly altered. Teams will now play each other a third time after a regular double-round robin schedule; each team will hence play a total of 33 matches. The schedule for the additional round of matches was determined by the final positions of the 2010 season, with the best six teams being assigned an extra home match in the process.

Matches 1–22

Matches 23–33

Statistics
Updated to games played on 29 October 2011.

Top scorers
Source: veikkausliiga.com

Top assists
Source: veikkausliiga.com

Monthly awards

Players of the year
Source: veikkausliiga.com

References

External links
 Official site 
 uefa.com

2011
1
Fin
Fin